Joseph Denis Murphy (May 20, 1898 – December 16, 1981) was an Irish author and New Thought minister, ordained in Divine Science and Religious Science.

Early life
Murphy was born in Ballydehob, County Cork, Ireland, the son of a private boys' school headmaster and raised a Roman Catholic. He joined the Jesuits. Murphy was enrolled in the National School and was encouraged to study for the priesthood and was accepted as a Jesuit seminarian. However, by the time he reached his late teen years, he began to question the Catholic orthodoxy of the Jesuits, and he withdrew from the seminary. His goal was to explore new ideas and gain new experiences—a goal he could not pursue in Catholic-dominated Ireland—he left his family to go to America. In his twenties, before being ordained a priest, an experience with healing prayer led him to leave the Jesuits and emigrate to the United States in 1922, He journeyed as a steerage passenger on board the RMS Cedric, sailing from Liverpool, England, to the Port of New York; on the ship's passenger manifest, his occupation was listed as chemist, the British term for pharmacist. He became a professional pharmacist in New York City (having a degree in chemistry by that time). Here he attended the Church of the Healing Christ (part of the Church of Divine Science), where Emmet Fox had become minister in 1931.

Career
Murphy traveled to India and spent a lot of time with Indian sages, learning Hindu philosophy. He later on formed a new church in America with Hindu ideologies.

In the mid-1940s, he moved to Los Angeles, where he met Religious Science founder Ernest Holmes, and was ordained into Religious Science by Holmes in 1946, thereafter teaching at Rochester, New York, and later at the Institute of Religious Science in Los Angeles. A meeting with Divine Science Association president Erwin Gregg led to him being re ordained into Divine Science, and he became the minister of the Los Angeles Divine Science Church in 1949, which he built into one of the largest New Thought congregations in the country.

When the United States entered World War II, Murphy enlisted in the Army and was assigned to work as a pharmacist in the medical unit of the 88th Infantry Division. At that time, he renewed his interest in religion and began to read extensively about various spiritual beliefs. After his discharge from the Army, he chose not to return to his career in pharmacy. He traveled extensively, taking courses in several universities both in the United States and abroad.

A person who had a particularly strong influence on Murphy was Thomas Troward, who was a judge as well as a philosopher, doctor, and professor. Troward became Murphy's mentor. From him he not only learned philosophy, theology, and law, but also was introduced to mysticism and particularly, the Masonic order. He became an active member of this order, and over the years rose in the Masonic ranks to the 32nd degree in the Scottish Rite.

Murphy chose to become a minister and bring his broad knowledge to the public. As his concept of Christianity was not traditional and ran counter to many of the Christian denominations, he founded his own church in Los Angeles. He attracted a small number of congregants, but it did not take long for his message of optimism and hope rather than the “sin-and-damnation” sermons of so many ministers to attract many men and women to his church.

Murphy was a proponent of the New Thought movement. This movement was developed in the late 19th and early 20th centuries by many philosophers and deep thinkers who studied this phenomenon and preached, wrote, and practiced a new way of looking at life and obtaining desires.

Murphy wrote more than 30 books. His most famous work, The Power of Your Subconscious Mind, was first published in 1963. It became an immediate bestseller and sold millions of copies worldwide.

Personal life and death
In the 1950s, Murphy married, earned a PhD in psychology from the University of Southern California and started writing.

After his first wife died in 1976, he remarried to a fellow Divine Science minister who was his longstanding secretary. He moved his ministry to Laguna Hills, California, where he died in 1981. His wife, Dr. Jean Murphy, continued in this ministry for some years afterwards.

Bibliography

This is It!: The Art of Metaphysical Demonstration 
Wheels of Truth (1946)
The Perfect Answer (1946)
Supreme Mastery of Fear (1946) 
St. John Speaks (1948) 
Love is Freedom (1948) 
The Twelve Powers Mystically Explained (1948) 
Riches are Your Right (aka Special Meditations for Health, Wealth, Love, and Expression) (1952)
The Miracles of Your Mind (1953)
The Fragrance of God (1953)
The Magic of Faith (1954)
The Meaning of Reincarnation (1954)
Believe in Yourself (1955)
How to Attract Money (1955)
Traveling With God (1956)
Peace Within Yourself (St. John Speaks revised) (1956)
Prayer Is the Answer (1956)
How to use your Healing Power (1957)
Quiet Moments with God (1958)
Pray Your Way Through It (1958)you
The Healing Power of Love (1958)
Stay Young Forever (1958)
Mental Poisons and Their Antidotes (1958)
How to Pray With a Deck of Cards (1958)
Living Without Strain (1959)
Techniques in Prayer Therapy
Nuclear Religion (1961)
Lord Teach Us to Pray (is the 2nd chapter of Traveling With God) (1962)
Why Did This Happen to Me? (1962)
The power of your Subconscious Mind (1963)
The Miracle of Mind Dynamics (1964)
The Amazing Laws of Cosmic Mind Power (1965)
Your Infinite Power to Be Rich (1966)
The Cosmic Power Within You (1968)

Infinite Power for Richer Living 
Secrets of the I ching (1970) 
Psychic Perception: The Magic of Extrasensory power (1971)
Miracle Power for Infinite Riches (1972) 
Telepsychics: The Magic Power of Perfect Living (1973)
The Cosmic Energizer: Miracle Power of the Universe (1974) 
Great Bible Truths for Human Problems (1976) 
Within You Is the Power (1977) 
Songs of God (1979) 
How to use the laws of Mind (1980) 
These Truths Can Change Your Life (1982)
Collected Essays of Joseph Murphy (1987)

See also
Napoleon Hill
Charles F. Haanel
Wallace Wattles
Uell Stanley Andersen

References

External links
 Biography, Joseph Murphy Trust
Joseph Murphy at Goodreads
Joseph Murphy at ThriftBooks
Joseph Murphy at Google Books
Joseph Murphy at Penguin Random House

1898 births
1981 deaths
American self-help writers
American spiritual teachers
American spiritual writers
Divine Science clergy
Former Jesuits
Irish emigrants to the United States
New Thought writers